The Abominable Iron Sloth is an American sludge metal band from Sacramento, California. The band features vocalist/guitarist Justin Godfrey, guitarists Cayle Hunter and Jeff Irwin, bassist Mike Martin, and drummer Mitch Wheeler.  They released their eponymous debut album through Goodfellow Records in early 2006. Their second album, The Id Will Overcome, was released in 2010.

The band's sound, which combines "the heaviness of Black Sabbath with the concussive force of hardcore punk," has been compared to those of sludge metal acts such as Eyehategod, Acid Bath, Iron Monkey and Melvins.

Band members 
Justin Godfrey – vocals, guitar
 Cayle Hunter – guitar
 Jeff Irwin – guitar
 Mike Martin – bass
 Mitch Wheeler – drums

Discography 
Studio albums
 The Abominable Iron Sloth (2006)
 The Id Will Overcome (2010)

References

External links 
 

American sludge metal musical groups
Heavy metal musical groups from California
Musical groups from Sacramento, California
Musical groups established in 2003
Musical quintets